O.N.I.F.C. is the fourth studio album by American rapper Wiz Khalifa. The album was released on December 4, 2012, by Atlantic Records and Rostrum Records. The album's title was inspired by the album H.N.I.C. by Prodigy of Mobb Deep, and is an initialism for "Only Nigga In First Class". Upon release, O.N.I.F.C. received generally mixed reviews from contemporary music critics. The album debuted at number two on the US Billboard 200 selling 148,000 copies in its first week.

Background
Guests on the album include 2 Chainz, Akon, Berner, Cam'ron, Courtney Noelle, Juicy J, Chevy Woods, Iamsu!, Lola Monroe, Pharrell, Problem, Tuki Carter, The Weeknd, and Amber Rose. Producers involved in the album include Cardo, Benny Blanco, Danja, I.D. Labs, Jim Jonsin, Pharrell Williams, Sledgren, Stargate and Pop Wansel. Fellow Pittsburgh-rapper Mac Miller has also recorded for the album, but it didn't make the cut. Wiz Khalifa announced on his Twitter account that he has a track in which he aims to collaborate with 50 Cent, making his guest appearance a possibility on the album. Wiz Khalifa released the track later, titled "Telescope" featuring the rapper. 50 Cent confirmed another track with him in an interview with the radio station, Power 106, which can be part of his upcoming project Street King Immortal or may be included in Wiz Khalifa's album but later turned into a free record. Wiz Khalifa has said Snoop Dogg, Mac Miller and Curren$y did not make the album due to records not being made in time and he had also talked to Drake and E-40 about being on the album.

The track listing was first confirmed on September 25, 2012, with the standard version's tracks. The album cover was ranked the fifth best of 2012 by Complex.

Release and promotion
Wiz Khalifa announced on April 11, 2012 that the album's release date would be on August 28. However the album was pushed back to September 18, 2012. On September 5, 2012, the album was pushed back again with no release date.

To promote the album before its release, Wiz Khalifa recorded the mixtape, Taylor Allderdice named after his hometown Taylor Allderdice High School, from which he graduated in 2006. The mixtape was released on March 13 under the Taylor Gang imprint and Rostrum Records. On October 16, 2012, Wiz Khalifa also released another mixtape titled Cabin Fever 2 in preparation for O.N.I.F.C. Wiz Khalifa went on the 2050 Tour in promotion of the album with Juicy J, Chevy Woods and Lola Monroe. The last show was on December 12, 2012, back in his home city of Pittsburgh.

Singles
The album's lead single, "Work Hard, Play Hard", was released on April 23, 2012 which was produced by Benny Blanco and the production team Stargate. The music video premiered on May 23, 2012, and included a tribute to Jimi Hendrix. Multiple Taylor Gang members make cameo appearances as well. As of June 10, 2014, the song has sold over 2,000,000 digital copies in the United States and peaked at number 17 on the Billboard Hot 100.

Wiz Khalifa announced and released the album's second single on September 24, 2012, after the album's delay. The single is called "Remember You" and features vocals from Canadian R&B recording artist The Weeknd, produced by Dpat and The Weeknd's longtime collaborator Illangelo. Wiz Khalifa also revealed the single's artwork. The song was released on the same day. The single has since peaked at number 63 on the Billboard Hot 100. On November 13, 2012, the music video was released for "Remember You".

On November 27, 2012, Wiz Khalifa released the music video for the song "The Bluff" featuring rapper Cam'ron. The music video was shot in Harlem, New York. On March 21, 2013, the music video was released for "Let It Go" featuring Akon. On April 25, 2013, the music video was released for "Bout Me" featuring Problem and Iamsu!. On June 11, 2013, the music video was released for "Paperbond". On November 12, 2013, the music video was released for "The Plan" featuring Juicy J.

Critical reception 

O.N.I.F.C. received generally mixed reviews from contemporary music critics. At Metacritic, which assigns a normalized rating out of 100 to reviews from mainstream critics, the album received an average score of 56, based on 20 reviews. AllMusic's Fred Thomas commented that it veers "between the growing pains of an artist forced to develop more quickly than he's ready to and material simply less inspired than the hungrier, more excited sounds that came before" on Rolling Papers. Alex Macpherson of The Guardian felt that the album's "finest turns come from guests" and called Khalifa "a serviceable but limited type, mostly concerned with getting stoned, capable of adequately riding a catchy hook ... or interesting beat". Evan Rytlewski of The A.V. Club criticized that he "splits the difference between his druggy muse and his pop obligations, without much interest in finding a middle ground." Slant Magazine's Ted Scheinman found its ultimate flaws to "have less to do with Khalifa's ego and more with the dumb, reflexive materialism of the lyrics." Pitchfork Media's Jordan Sargent found his rapping inconsequential to the production and wrote that most of the album "questions the relevancy of Khalifa's artistic existence." Dan Weiss of Spin felt that Khalifa "just doesn't say anything worth faintly echoing through a reverb filter."

In a positive review, Kyle Anderson of Entertainment Weekly wrote that Khalifa's "bleary-eyed charisma elevates both radio bait" and "trippy shape-shifters". Although he found the subject matter to be "pretty standard", Jody Rosen of Rolling Stone commented that Khalifa's "aural smoke billows" are "just off-kilter enough ... to give you a contact high", and called the album "as solid as Rolling Papers was slack." Sowmya Krishnamurthy of The Village Voice felt that its production "really works" and said that the album is "pleasant enough if not particularly inspired". David Amidon of PopMatters asserted that, "as pop rap albums go, O.N.I.F.C. is beyond solid, full of immaculate production and airtight if simplistic rhymes about money, girls and weed."

Commercial performance 
O.N.I.F.C. debuted at number two on the US Billboard 200, selling 148,000 copies in its first week. In its second week the album sold 40,000 more copies dropping to number 25. As of March 2013, it has sold 352,000 copies. The album was certified platinum by the Recording Industry Association of America (RIAA) for combined sales and album-equivalent units of over a million units in the United States.

Several songs from O.N.I.F.C. charted upon the album's release. "Let It Go" featuring Akon debuted and peaked at number 87 on the Billboard Hot 100, number 91 on the Billboard Canadian Hot 100 chart and number 25 on the US Hot R&B/Hip-Hop Songs chart. "It's Nothin'" featuring 2 Chainz and "Paperbond" both debuted and peaked at numbers seven and 22 respectively on the Bubbling Under Hot 100 Singles chart, while "Medicated" featuring Chevy Woods & Juicy J and "Bluffin'" featuring Berner peaked at numbers 44 and 47 on the Hot R&B/Hip-Hop Songs chart, respectively.

In 2013, O.N.I.F.C. was ranked as the 67th most popular album of the year on the Billboard 200.

Track listing 

Note

Personnel 
Credits for O.N.I.F.C. adapted from Allmusic.

 2 Chainz – featured artist
 Akon – featured artist
 Amber Rose – featured artist
 Marcella "Ms. Lago" Araica – engineer, mixing
 Elisa Asato – project coordinator
 Fatima Bah – design
 Berner - featured artist
 Big Jerm – engineer
 Tim Blacksmith – executive producer
 Benny Blanco – instrumentation, producer, programming
 Tanisha Broadwater – production coordination
 Jack "Suthernfolk" Brown – engineer
 Nathan Burgess – assistant
 Greg Gigendad Burke – art direction, design
 Cam'ron – featured artist
 Cardo – producer
 Tuki Carter – featured artist
 Danja – producer
 Danny D. – executive producer
 Sarah Demarco – project coordinator
 DPat – producer
 Andrew Drucker – engineer, producer
 Will Dzombak – assistant management
 Earl & E – producer
 Zvi Edelman – A&R
 Mikkel S. Eriksen – engineer, instrumentation, programming
 Lanre Gaba – A&R
 Chris Gehringer – mastering
 Christopher "Drumma Boy" Gholson – producer
 Lena Gonzalez – sampled vocals
 Eric Goudy II – keyboards, programming
 Benjy Grinberg – executive producer, management
 Tor Erik Hermansen – instrumentation, programming
 Marc Hom – photography
 Earl Hood – keyboards, programming

 Matt Huber – assistant
 Jo A – producer
 Jim Jonsin – keyboards, producer, programming
 Juicy J – featured artist
 Yoshi Kondo – engineer
 Mike Larson – arranger, editing, engineer, producer
 Andre Lipscomb – arranger, engineer
 Rico Love – producer, vocals
 Andrew Luftman – assistant engineer
 Robert Marks – engineer, mixing
 Donnie Meadows – production coordination
 Lola Monroe – featured artist
 Courtney Noelle – featured artist
 Priya Perera – A&R
 Pharrell – featured artist, producer
 Aryanna Platt – sampled vocals
 Nice Rec – producer
 Dana Richard – assistant
 Daniela Rivera – assistant engineer, engineer
 Ron Robinson – engineer
 Eric Henry Rostrum – additional production
 Rykeyz – producer
 Sledgren – producer
 Stargate – producer
 Phil Tan – mixing
 Miles Walker – engineer
 Andrew "Pop" Wansel – producer
 The Weeknd – featured artist
 Finis "KY" White – mixing
 Jason Wilkie – engineer
 Wiz Khalifa – primary artist
 Chevy Woods – featured artist
 Scott "Yarmov" Yarmovsky – project coordinator
 Daniel Zaidenstadt – assistant
 The Invasion - producer

Charts

Weekly charts

Year-end charts

Certifications

Release history

References 

2012 albums
Wiz Khalifa albums
Atlantic Records albums
Rostrum Records albums
Albums produced by Benny Blanco
Albums produced by Pharrell Williams
Albums produced by Stargate
Albums produced by Drumma Boy
Albums produced by Jim Jonsin
Albums produced by Cardo
Albums produced by Illangelo
Albums produced by Rico Love